This is a list of male players who have been named in the national water polo team squad in at least three or four Olympic tournaments since the inaugural official edition in 1900.

Abbreviations

Overall multi-time Olympians
As of the 2020 Summer Olympics, 87 male players have been named in the national water polo team squad in four or more men's Olympic tournaments.

By tournament
The following table is pre-sorted by edition of the Olympics (in ascending order), name of the team (in ascending order), name of the player (in ascending order), respectively. Last updated: 27 July 2021.

Legend
 Team* – Host team

By confederation
Last updated: 27 July 2021.

By team
Last updated: 27 July 2021.

Legend
 Team† – Defunct team

By position
Last updated: 27 July 2021.

Five-time Olympians

Multi-time Olympians by team
The following tables are pre-sorted by number of Olympic appearances (in descending order), year of the last Olympic appearance (in ascending order), year of the first Olympic appearance (in ascending order), date of birth (in ascending order), name of the player (in ascending order), respectively.

Legend
 Year* – As host team
 Team† – Defunct team

Argentina
 Men's national team: 
 Team appearances: 4 (1928, 1948–1952, 1960)
 As host team: —
 Number of five-time Olympians: 0
 Number of four-time Olympians: 0
 Last updated: 27 July 2021.

Australia
 Men's national team: 
 Team appearances: 17 (1948–1964, 1972–1992, 2000*–2020)
 As host team: 1956*, 2000*
* Number of five-time Olympians: 0
 Number of four-time Olympians: 6
 Last updated: 27 July 2021.

Legend
  – Hosts

Note:
 Pietro Figlioli is listed in section Italy.

Austria
 Men's national team: 
 Team appearances: 3 (1912, 1936, 1952)
 As host team: —
 Number of four-time Olympians: 0
 Number of three-time Olympians: 0
 Last updated: 27 July 2021.

Belgium
 Men's national team: 
 Team appearances: 11 (1900, 1908–1928, 1936–1952, 1960–1964)
 As host team: 1920*
* Number of five-time Olympians: 0
 Number of four-time Olympians: 2
 Last updated: 27 July 2021.

Legend
  – Hosts

Brazil
 Men's national team: 
 Team appearances: 8 (1920, 1932, 1952, 1960–1968, 1984, 2016*)
 As host team: 2016*
* Number of four-time Olympians: 0
 Number of three-time Olympians: 3
 Last updated: 27 July 2021.

Legend and abbreviation
  – Hosts
 BRA – Brazil
 SRB – Serbia

Bulgaria
 Men's national team: 
 Team appearances: 2 (1972, 1980)
 As host team: —
 Number of four-time Olympians: 0
 Number of three-time Olympians: 0
 Last updated: 27 July 2021.

Canada
 Men's national team: 
 Team appearances: 4 (1972–1976*, 1984, 2008)
 As host team: 1976*
* Number of four-time Olympians: 0
 Number of three-time Olympians: 0
 Last updated: 27 July 2021.

Chile
 Men's national team: 
 Team appearances: 1 (1948)
 As host team: —
 Number of four-time Olympians: 0
 Number of three-time Olympians: 0
 Last updated: 27 July 2021.

China
 Men's national team: 
 Team appearances: 3 (1984–1988, 2008*)
 As host team: 2008*
 Number of four-time Olympians: 0
 Number of three-time Olympians: 0
 Last updated: 27 July 2021.

Croatia
 Men's national team: 
 Team appearances: 7 (1996–2020)
 As host team: —
 Related team: Yugoslavia†
* Number of six-time Olympians: 0
 Number of five-time Olympians: 2
 Number of four-time Olympians: 6
 Last updated: 27 July 2021.

Abbreviation
 CRO – Croatia
 ESP – Spain
 YUG – Yugoslavia

Cuba
 Men's national team: 
 Team appearances: 5 (1968–1980, 1992)
 As host team: —
 Number of five-time Olympians: 0
 Number of four-time Olympians: 1
 Last updated: 27 July 2021.

Note:
 Iván Pérez is listed in section Spain.

Czechoslovakia
 Men's national team: †
 Team appearances: 5 (1920–1928, 1936, 1992)
 As host team: —
 Related team: Slovakia
 Number of five-time Olympians: 0
 Number of four-time Olympians: 0
 Last updated: 27 July 2021.

East Germany
 Men's national team: †
 Team appearances: 1 (1968)
 As host team: —
 Related teams: Germany, United Team of Germany†
 Number of four-time Olympians: 0
 Number of three-time Olympians: 0
 Last updated: 27 July 2021.

Egypt
 Men's national team: 
 Team appearances: 6 (1948–1952, 1960–1968, 2004)
 As host team: —
* Number of four-time Olympians: 0
 Number of three-time Olympians: 2
 Last updated: 27 July 2021.

France
 Men's national team: 
 Team appearances: 11 (1900*, 1912–1928, 1936–1948, 1960, 1988–1992, 2016)
 As host team: 1900*, 1924*
* Number of five-time Olympians: 0
 Number of four-time Olympians: 1
 Last updated: 27 July 2021.

Legend
  – Hosts

Germany
 Men's national team: 
 Team appearances: 9 (1900, 1928–1936*, 1952, 1992–1996, 2004–2008)
 As host team: 1936*
 Related teams: United Team of Germany†, East Germany†, West Germany†
 Number of five-time Olympians: 0
 Number of four-time Olympians: 1
 Last updated: 8 March 2021.

Legend and abbreviation
  – Hosts
 FRG – West Germany
 GER – Germany

Great Britain
 Men's national team: 
 Team appearances: 11 (1900, 1908*–1928, 1936–1956, 2012*)
 As host team: 1908*, 1948*, 2012*
* Number of six-time Olympians: 0
 Number of five-time Olympians: 1
 Number of four-time Olympians: 1
 Last updated: 27 July 2021.

Legend
  – Hosts

Greece
 Men's national team: 
 Team appearances: 16 (1920–1924, 1948, 1968–1972, 1980–2020)
 As host team: 2004*
* Number of six-time Olympians: 0
 Number of five-time Olympians: 2
 Number of four-time Olympians: 7
 Last updated: 27 July 2021.

Legend
  – Hosts

Hungary
 Men's national team: 
 Team appearances: 23 (1912, 1924–1980, 1988–2020)
 As host team: —
* Number of six-time Olympians: 0
 Number of five-time Olympians: 3
 Number of four-time Olympians: 12
 Last updated: 8 August 2021.

Iceland
 Men's national team: 
 Team appearances: 1 (1936)
 As host team: —
 Number of four-time Olympians: 0
 Number of three-time Olympians: 0
 Last updated: 27 July 2021.

India
 Men's national team: 
 Team appearances: 2 (1948–1952)
 As host team: —
 Number of four-time Olympians: 0
 Number of three-time Olympians: 0
 Last updated: 27 July 2021.

Iran
 Men's national team: 
 Team appearances: 1 (1976)
 As host team: —
 Number of four-time Olympians: 0
 Number of three-time Olympians: 0
 Last updated: 27 July 2021.

Republic of Ireland
 Men's national team: 
 Team appearances: 2 (1924–1928)
 As host team: —
 Number of four-time Olympians: 0
 Number of three-time Olympians: 0
 Last updated: 27 July 2021.

Italy
 Men's national team: 
 Team appearances: 21 (1920–1924, 1948–2020)
 As host team: 1960*
* Number of six-time Olympians: 0
 Number of five-time Olympians: 3
 Number of four-time Olympians: 7
 Last updated: 27 July 2021.

Legend and abbreviation
  – Hosts
 AUS – Australia
 ITA – Italy

Japan
 Men's national team: 
 Team appearances: 9 (1932–1936, 1960–1972, 1984, 2016–2020)
 As host team: 1964, 2020*
* Number of four-time Olympians: 0
 Number of three-time Olympians: 0
 Last updated: 27 July 2021.

Kazakhstan
 Men's national team: 
 Team appearances: 4 (2000–2004, 2012, 2020)
 As host team: —
 Related teams: Soviet Union†, Unified Team†
* Number of five-time Olympians: 0
 Number of four-time Olympians: 1
 Last updated: 27 July 2021.

Abbreviation
 KAZ – Kazakhstan
 RUS – Russia

Luxembourg
 Men's national team: 
 Team appearances: 1 (1928)
 As host team: —
 Number of four-time Olympians: 0
 Number of three-time Olympians: 0
 Last updated: 27 July 2021.

Malta
 Men's national team: 
 Team appearances: 2 (1928, 1936)
 As host team: —
 Number of four-time Olympians: 0
 Number of three-time Olympians: 0
 Last updated: 27 July 2021.

Mexico
 Men's national team: 
 Team appearances: 4 (1952, 1968*–1976)
 As host team: 1968*
 Number of five-time Olympians: 0
 Number of four-time Olympians: 0
 Last updated: 27 July 2021.

Note:
 Armando Fernández is listed in section West Germany.

Montenegro
 Men's national team: 
 Team appearances: 4 (2008–2020)
 As host team: —
 Related teams: Yugoslavia†, FR Yugoslavia†, Serbia and Montenegro†
* Number of five-time Olympians: 0
 Number of four-time Olympians: 3
 Last updated: 27 July 2021.

Abbreviation
 MNE – Montenegro
 SCG – Serbia and Montenegro

Netherlands
 Men's national team: 
 Team appearances: 17 (1908, 1920–1928*, 1936–1952, 1960–1984, 1992–2000)
 As host team: 1928*
* Number of five-time Olympians: 0
 Number of four-time Olympians: 1
 Last updated: 27 July 2021.

Legend
  – Hosts

Portugal
 Men's national team: 
 Team appearances: 1 (1952)
 As host team: —
 Number of four-time Olympians: 0
 Number of three-time Olympians: 0
 Last updated: 27 July 2021.

Romania
 Men's national team: 
 Team appearances: 9 (1952–1964, 1972–1980, 1996, 2012)
 As host team: —
* Number of four-time Olympians: 0
 Number of three-time Olympians: 5
 Last updated: 27 July 2021.

Russia
 Men's national team: 
 Team appearances: 3 (1996–2004)
 As host team: —
 Related teams: Soviet Union†, Unified Team†
* Number of five-time Olympians: 0
 Number of four-time Olympians: 2
 Last updated: 27 July 2021.

Abbreviation
 EUN – Unified Team
 RUS – Russia

Note:
 Nikolay Maksimov is listed in section Kazakhstan.

Serbia
 Men's national team: 
 Team appearances: 4 (2008–2020)
 As host team: —
 Related teams: Yugoslavia†, FR Yugoslavia†, Serbia and Montenegro†
* Number of five-time Olympians: 0
 Number of four-time Olympians: 6
 Last updated: 8 August 2021.

Abbreviation
 FRY – FR Yugoslavia
 SCG – Serbia and Montenegro
 SRB – Serbia

Serbia and Montenegro
 Men's national team: †
 Team appearances: 1 (2004)
 As host team: —
 Related teams: Yugoslavia†, FR Yugoslavia†, Montenegro, Serbia
 Number of five-time Olympians: 0
 Number of four-time Olympians: 0
 Last updated: 27 July 2021.

Notes:
 Predrag Jokić is listed in section Montenegro.
 Aleksandar Šapić is listed in section Serbia.
 Dejan Savić is listed in section Serbia.
 Vladimir Vujasinović is listed in section Serbia.

Singapore
 Men's national team: 
 Team appearances: 1 (1956)
 As host team: —
 Number of four-time Olympians: 0
 Number of three-time Olympians: 0
 Last updated: 27 July 2021.

Slovakia
 Men's national team: 
 Team appearances: 1 (2000)
 As host team: —
 Related team: Czechoslovakia†
 Number of five-time Olympians: 0
 Number of four-time Olympians: 0
 Last updated: 27 July 2021.

South Africa
 Men's national team: 
 Team appearances: 3 (1952, 1960, 2020)
 As host team: —
 Number of four-time Olympians: 0
 Number of three-time Olympians: 0
 Last updated: 27 July 2021.

South Korea
 Men's national team: 
 Team appearances: 1 (1988*)
 As host team: 1988*
 Number of four-time Olympians: 0
 Number of three-time Olympians: 0
 Last updated: 27 July 2021.

Soviet Union
 Men's national team: †
 Team appearances: 9 (1952–1980*, 1988)
 As host team: 1980*
 Related teams: Unified Team†, Kazakhstan, Russia, Ukraine
* Number of five-time Olympians: 0
 Number of four-time Olympians: 1
 Last updated: 27 July 2021.

Legend
  – Hosts

Spain
 Men's national team: 
 Team appearances: 18 (1920–1928, 1948–1952, 1968–1972, 1980–2020)
 As host team: 1992*
* Number of six-time Olympians: 1
 Number of five-time Olympians: 3
 Number of four-time Olympians: 7
 Last updated: 27 July 2021.

Legend and abbreviation
  – Hosts
 CUB – Cuba
 ESP – Spain

Note:
 Xavier García is listed in section Croatia.

Sweden
 Men's national team: 
 Team appearances: 8 (1908–1924, 1936–1952, 1980)
 As host team: 1912*
* Number of five-time Olympians: 0
 Number of four-time Olympians: 0
 Last updated: 27 July 2021.

Switzerland
 Men's national team: 
 Team appearances: 5 (1920–1928, 1936–1948)
 As host team: —
 Number of five-time Olympians: 0
 Number of four-time Olympians: 0
 Last updated: 27 July 2021.

Ukraine
 Men's national team: 
 Team appearances: 1 (1996)
 As host team: —
 Related teams: Soviet Union†, Unified Team†
 Number of five-time Olympians: 0
 Number of four-time Olympians: 0
 Last updated: 27 July 2021.

Unified Team
 Men's national team:  Unified Team†
 Team appearances: 1 (1992)
 As host team: —
 Related teams: Soviet Union†, Kazakhstan, Russia, Ukraine
 Number of five-time Olympians: 0
 Number of four-time Olympians: 0
 Last updated: 27 July 2021.

Notes:
 Dmitry Gorshkov is listed in section Russia.
 Nikolay Kozlov is listed in section Russia.

United States
 Men's national team: 
 Team appearances: 22 (1920–1972, 1984*–2020)
 As host team: 1932*, 1984*, 1996*
* Number of six-time Olympians: 0
 Number of five-time Olympians: 2
 Number of four-time Olympians: 2
 Last updated: 27 July 2021.

Legend
  – Hosts

United Team of Germany
 Men's national team:  United Team of Germany†
 Team appearances: 3 (1956–1964)
 As host team: —
 Related teams: Germany, East Germany†, West Germany†
 Number of five-time Olympians: 0
 Number of four-time Olympians: 0
 Last updated: 27 July 2021.

Uruguay
 Men's national team: 
 Team appearances: 2 (1936–1948)
 As host team: —
 Number of four-time Olympians: 0
 Number of three-time Olympians: 0
 Last updated: 27 July 2021.

West Germany
 Men's national team: †
 Team appearances: 5 (1968–1976, 1984–1988)
 As host team: 1972*
 Related teams: Germany, United Team of Germany†
 Number of five-time Olympians: 0
 Number of four-time Olympians: 1
 Last updated: 8 March 2021.

Legend and abbreviation
  – Hosts
 FRG – West Germany
 MEX – Mexico

Note:
 Peter Röhle is listed in section Germany.

Yugoslavia
 Men's national team: †
 Team appearances: 12 (1936–1988)
 As host team: —
 Related teams: Croatia, FR Yugoslavia†, Serbia and Montenegro†, Montenegro, Serbia
* Number of five-time Olympians: 0
 Number of four-time Olympians: 2
 Last updated: 27 July 2021.

Note:
 Dubravko Šimenc is listed in section Croatia.

FR Yugoslavia
 Men's national team: †
 Team appearances: 2 (1996–2000)
 As host team: —
 Related teams: Yugoslavia†, Serbia and Montenegro†, Montenegro, Serbia
 Number of five-time Olympians: 0
 Number of four-time Olympians: 0
 Last updated: 27 July 2021.

Notes:
 Aleksandar Šapić is listed in section Serbia.
 Dejan Savić is listed in section Serbia.
 Vladimir Vujasinović is listed in section Serbia.

See also
 Water polo at the Summer Olympics

 Lists of Olympic water polo records and statistics
 List of men's Olympic water polo tournament records and statistics
 List of women's Olympic water polo tournament records and statistics
 List of Olympic champions in men's water polo
 List of Olympic champions in women's water polo
 National team appearances in the men's Olympic water polo tournament
 National team appearances in the women's Olympic water polo tournament
 List of players who have appeared in multiple women's Olympic water polo tournaments
 List of Olympic medalists in water polo (men)
 List of Olympic medalists in water polo (women)
 List of men's Olympic water polo tournament top goalscorers
 List of women's Olympic water polo tournament top goalscorers
 List of men's Olympic water polo tournament goalkeepers
 List of women's Olympic water polo tournament goalkeepers
 List of Olympic venues in water polo

Notes

References

Sources

ISHOF

External links
 Olympic water polo – Official website

Players, Men